Lee Yong-seop (born 11 September 1951) is a South Korean public servant and politician. He served as Member of the National Assembly and currently serves as the mayor of Gwangju.

References

External links
 Lee Yong-seop's Home page

1951 births
Living people
Minjoo Party of Korea politicians
People from South Jeolla Province
Provincial governors of South Korea